
Tarnów County is a unit of territorial administration and local government (powiat) in Lesser Poland Voivodeship, southern Poland. It came into being on January 1, 1999, as a result of the Polish local government reforms passed in 1998. Its administrative seat is the city of Tarnów, although the city is not part of the county (it constitutes a separate city county).

As of 2006 its total population was 193,549, out of which the population of Tuchów was 6,501, that of Żabno 4,271, that of Wojnicz 3,404, that of Ryglice 2,784, that of Ciężkowice 2,378, that of Zakliczyn 1,556, and the rural population was 176,059 (including approximately 2,800 for the population of Radłów, which became a town in 2010).

Neighbouring counties
Apart from the city of Tarnów, Tarnów County is also bordered by Dąbrowa County to the north, Dębica County to the east, Jasło County to the south-east, Gorlice County and Nowy Sącz County to the south, Brzesko County and Proszowice County to the west, and Kazimierza County to the north-west.

Administrative division
The county is subdivided into 16 gminas (seven urban-rural and nine rural). These are listed in the following table, in descending order of population.

References
Polish official population figures 2006

 
Land counties of Lesser Poland Voivodeship